The 2d Marine Division is a Marine infantry division of the United States Marine Corps headquartered at Marine Corps Base Camp Lejeune, North Carolina. It is the ground combat element of the II Marine Expeditionary Force (II MEF).

Together with 1st Marine Division, it is the oldest and largest active duty division in the United States Marine Corps, representing a combat-ready force of more than 19,000 men and women. It is one of three active duty divisions in the Marine Corps today and is a multi-role, expeditionary ground combat force. It is nicknamed "The Silent Second".

The 2d Marine Division participated in World War II, Operation in Panama, Gulf War, Iraq War and War in Afghanistan.

During its history, three commanding generals became the Commandant of the Marine Corps (Randolph M. Pate, Alfred M. Gray Jr. and James L. Jones) and another three commanding generals became Assistant Commandant of the Marine Corps (Samuel Jaskilka, Kenneth McLennan and Richard I. Neal).

Commanding generals

See also
 List of United States Marine Corps divisions
 List of 1st Marine Division Commanders
 List of 3rd Marine Division Commanders
 List of 1st Marine Aircraft Wing Commanders
 List of Historically Important U.S. Marines
 List of United States Marine Corps aircraft wings
 List of active United States Marine Corps aircraft squadrons

References

Divisions of the United States Marine Corps
United States Marine Corps generals